72 Floors of Mystery (Chinese: 七十二层奇楼) is a 2017 Chinese adventure variety show on Hunan Television. The members of the cast are Kris Wu, Simon Yam, Leo Wu, Zhao Liying, Wowkie Zhang, Wang Xiaoli, Liu Chang, Waer. The team is tasked with solving mysteries that will aid in understanding the secret behind the 72-floor building. Each episode supposedly was a floor in the 72 story tower that the cast members solved.

The show premiered on May 5 via Hunan TV. It will air every Friday at 20:20 for 12 episodes.

Team

Guest
1st episode: William Chan
2nd episode: Alan Yu
3rd episode: Kathy Chow
4th episode: 
5th episode: Neo Hou 
6th episode:  Kong Chuinan
7th episode: Kong Chuinan 
8th episode: Neo Hou, Calvin Du
9th episode: Guo Junchen, Peng Yuchang, Zhou You
10th episode: Zhou You,  Guo Junchen, Meng Jia , Guo Jingfei
11th episode: Niu Junfeng, Zhou Yiwei, Zhou You, Zhang Yi
12th episode: Zhang Yi

References 

Variety shows
Chinese television shows
Chinese variety television shows
2017 Chinese television series debuts